Pranati Deka (Assamese: প্ৰণতি ডেকা) is the Cultural Secretary of the outlawed outfit ULFA in Assam. She hails from Nalbari district of Assam. She is also the wife of the outfit's finance secretary Chitrabon Hazarika.

Arrest
Deka was first arrested on August 23, 1996 from Jaslok Hospital in Mumbai. She was released on bail in 1998. In 2003 she was again arrested at Phulbari in Garo Hills district of  Meghalaya while trying to escape.

Charges
Cases registered against her are:

See also
List of top leaders of ULFA
Sanjukta Mukti Fouj

References

People from Nalbari district
Living people
Prisoners and detainees from Assam
ULFA members
Year of birth missing (living people)